Hollywood Casino Aurora was originally a riverboat casino located on the Fox River in Aurora, Illinois, a western suburb of Chicago. It is owned by Gaming and Leisure Properties and operated by Penn Entertainment.

Casino information
Hollywood Casino Aurora opened in 1993 as Hollywood Casino Corp.'s first riverboat casino. The casino's ownership transferred to Penn National Gaming (now Penn Entertainment) after its acquisition of Hollywood Casino Corp. in 2003.

Two riverboats were first used, replaced by a 70,000 square feet floating, moored, half-circle structure.

The casino has 53,000 square feet of gaming space and over 1,000 slot machines and 26 table games. 1 restaurant on the property, Fairbanks Steakhouse. To comply with Illinois law, it is not open 24 hours a day and is smoke-free.

A law in the Illinois senate which would allow non-riverboat casinos has been favored by Penn National, as it is interested in moving the Aurora casino to an area near the Chicago Premium Outlets.

See also
List of casinos in Illinois

References

External links

Aurora, Illinois
Casinos in Illinois
Riverboat casinos
Casinos completed in 1993